Yvette Yong (born 9 March 1990 in Vancouver) is a Canadian taekwondo practitioner. She is a former World Championships bronze medallist. In 2015, she was named to Canada's team at the 2015 Pan American Games to be held in Toronto.

Career
Yong competed at the 2019 Pan American Games losing in the quarterfinals.

In July 2021, Yong was named to Canada's 2020 Olympic team.

References

External links
 

1990 births
Living people
Canadian female taekwondo practitioners
World Taekwondo Championships medalists
Taekwondo practitioners at the 2015 Pan American Games
Pan American Games competitors for Canada
Taekwondo practitioners at the 2019 Pan American Games
Taekwondo practitioners at the 2020 Summer Olympics

Sportspeople from Vancouver
Olympic taekwondo practitioners of Canada
21st-century Canadian women